Protein kinase C iota type is an enzyme that in humans is encoded by the PRKCI gene.

Function 

This gene encodes a member of the protein kinase C (PKC) family of serine/threonine protein kinases. The PKC family comprises at least eight members, which are differentially expressed and are involved in a wide variety of cellular processes. This protein kinase is calcium-independent and phospholipid-dependent. It is not activated by phorbol esters or diacylglycerol. This kinase can be recruited to vesicle tubular clusters (VTCs) by direct interaction with the small GTPase RAB2, where this kinase phosphorylates glyceraldehyde-3-phosphate dehydrogenase (GAPD/GAPDH) and plays a role in microtubule dynamics in the early secretory pathway. This kinase is found to be necessary for BCL-ABL-mediated resistance to drug-induced apoptosis and therefore protects leukemia cells against drug-induced apoptosis. There is a single exon pseudogene mapped on chromosome X.

Interactions 

PRKCI has been shown to interact with:

 Centaurin, alpha 1, 
 FRS2, 
 Glyceraldehyde 3-phosphate dehydrogenase, 
 PARD3,
 Phosphoinositide-dependent kinase-1, 
 SMG1 (gene),
 Sequestosome 1, 
 KRAS. 
 Vimentin

References

Further reading 

 
 
 
 
 
 
 
 
 
 
 
 
 
 
 
 
 
 
 

EC 2.7.11